Shotter's Nation is the second album by English rock band Babyshambles and was released in the United Kingdom on 1 October 2007 by Parlophone to generally favourable reviews. In the United States the album was released on 23 October 2007 by Astralwerks. The first single from the album, "Delivery", was released on 17 September 2007.

The album was produced by Stephen Street and recorded at Olympic Studios in London, England. The acoustic closer, "The Lost Art of Murder", features a guest appearance from Bert Jansch.

It is the first Pete Doherty album without Mick Jones producing and his first released by a major label.

In an interview with NME magazine, Pete Doherty said that The Strokes (and solo) guitar player Albert Hammond, Jr., plays guitar on the album. Doherty did not mention the track's name, but did say it was an extremely short three bars of music.
A limited edition of the album contains a DVD with a 40-minute track-by-track interview, 5 live songs recorded at the Boogaloo on 5 July 2007, and the music video of "Delivery".

The album's cover painting by Alizé Meurisse is based on the painting The Death of Chatterton by Henry Wallis (1856). It also originally featured an image of Kate Moss, which was replaced with an unknown lookalike.

The song "There She Goes" has been compared to "Lovecats" by The Cure by Garry Mulholland of The Observer. Drew McConnell revealed in interviews that the band wanted the song to sound something like "Walk on the Wild Side" by Lou Reed.

The band promoted the album by appearing in TV and radio shows in France and in the UK. They then played "Delivery" at the MTV EMA. The performance has been widely acclaimed.

There is a video for "French Dog Blues" featuring an animated French Dog. Ian Brown has songwriting credits to the aforementioned song. This is because the song contains a verse from "Deep Pile Dreams", a song from Brown's first album Unfinished Monkey Business.

The album was #14 in NME albums of the year.

Reception

The album was released to generally favorable reviews.

Track listing
 "Carry On Up the Morning" (Peter Doherty, Michael Whitnall) – 2:57
 "Delivery" (Doherty, Whitnall) – 2:41
 "You Talk" (Doherty, Kate Moss) – 3:30
 "UnBiloTitled" (Doherty, Peter Wolfe, Adam Ficek) – 3:52
 "Side of the Road" (Doherty) – 2:09
 "Crumb Begging Baghead" (Doherty, Whitnall) – 3:43
 "Unstookie Titled" (Doherty, Whitnall, Ficek) – 4:30
 "French Dog Blues" (Doherty, Ian Brown, Moss) – 3:32
 "There She Goes" (Doherty) – 3:36
 "Baddie's Boogie" (Toczek, Doherty, Whitnall, Moss) – 3:55
 "Deft Left Hand" (Doherty, Whitnall, Moss) – 4:04
 "Lost Art of Murder" (Doherty) – 4:38

Limited edition bonus DVD: We Like to Boogaloo
 The Boogaloo Tapes (Track by track interview)which actually contains a hidden video (or DVD "easter egg") while the band are talking about the song Crumb Begging Baghead, a French dog appears, and pressing enter selects this video.
 Live at the Boogaloo
 "Delivery"
 "Baddie's Boogie"
 "UnBiloTitled"
 "There She Goes"
 "Pipedown"
 "Delivery" (Video)

"French" edition bonus DVD: Drew's Birthday: Live à L'Elysée Montmartre
Live at l'Elysee Montmartre recorded on 13 November 2006
 "Pipedown"
 "Beg Steal or Borrow"
 "You Talk"
 "Sedative"
 "Killamangiro"
 "Time for Heroes"
 "Albion"
 "Fuck Forever"
 "The Blinding"
 "Backstage footage"
It was released on 12 May 2008

Personnel
 Peter Doherty – guitar, vocals, design
 Michael Whitnall – guitar, vocals
 Adam Ficek – drums, percussion, keyboards, vocals
 Drew McConnell – bass guitar, double bass, vocals
 Stephen Large – keyboards on track 4 and 8
 Bert Jansch – guitar on track 12
 Stephen Street – producer, mixing, additional guitar on tracks 11 and 12
 Tom Stanley – engineer
 Mo Hausler – assistant engineer
 Cenzo Townshend – mixing
 Neil Comber – assistant mix engineer
 Traffic – design
 Alizé Meurisse – cover painting
 Todd Korol – cover photograph

Singles
Delivery (17 June), (2007), (Parlophone) #6
You Talk (3 December), (2007), (Parlophone) #54

Charts and certifications

Weekly charts

Year-end charts

Certifications

See also
Babyshambles discography

References

2007 albums
Babyshambles albums
Parlophone albums
Albums produced by Stephen Street